Hugh Carlyle Taylor (4 December 1900 – 17 November 1970) was an Australian rugby union player and represented for the Wallabies four times.

He attended Newington College (1906–1913) and St Andrew's College within the University of Sydney. In 1944, Taylor married Edith Jean Edwards in Mosman, New South Wales.

References

1900 births
1970 deaths
Australian rugby union players
Rugby union locks
People educated at Newington College
Australia international rugby union players
Rugby union players from New South Wales